Constitutional Assembly elections were held in Cuba on 15 September 1900. The result was a victory for the Republican–Democratic Coalition (an alliance of the Republican Party and Democratic Union Party), which won 18 of the 31 seats.

Results

References

Cuba
Elections in Cuba
Constitutional Assembly election
Cuban Constitutional Assembly election
Election and referendum articles with incomplete results